Dance Theater Workshop, colloquially known as DTW, was a New York City performance space and service organization for dance companies that operated from 1965 to 2011. After a merger it became known as New York Live Arts

Located as 219 West 19th Street between Seventh and Eighth Avenues in the Chelsea neighborhood of Manhattan, DTW was founded in 1965 by Jeff Duncan, Art Bauman and Jack Moore as a choreographers' collective.  In 2002 DTW opened its new Doris Duke Performance Center, which contains the 192-seat Bessie Schönberg Theatre.

From 1975-2003, DTW was led by David R. White, Executive Director and Producer. Under White's leadership, DTW became one of the most influential contemporary performing arts centers and artist incubators in the United States and abroad, responsible for identifying and nurturing some of the most important dance and other performing artists of our time, including: Bill T. Jones, Mark Morris, Susan Marshall, Whoopi Goldberg, Bill Irwin, Guillermo Gomez-Pena, Anne Teresa de Keersmaeker, Annie-B Parson and Paul Lazar, Donald Byrd and John Jasperse, among many others.

In 2011, DTW merged with the Bill T. Jones/Arnie Zane Dance Company to become New York Live Arts The move came out of a need for greater financial stability for both organizations, and a permanent home for the dance company, which had sought one for many years.

Scope
More than 200 concerts and exhibits by some 70 contemporary dance, theater, music, visual and video artists were sponsored annually by Dance Theater Workshop. DTW presented notable artists including: Mark Morris, David Gordon, Bill T. Jones, Laura Dean, Susan Marshall, Ron Brown, Donald Byrd, H.T. Chen, David Dorfman, Doug Elkins, Molissa Fenley, Whoopi Goldberg, Lawrence Goldhuber, Margaret Fisher, Janie Geiser, Bill Irwin, LadyGourd Sangoma, Ralph Lemon, Bebe Miller, Michael Moschen, David Parsons, Lenny Pickett, Merián Soto, Pepón Osorio, Paul Zaloom and hundreds of others.

See also
List of theaters for dance

References
Notes

External links

 Dance Theater Workshop page at Dance Heritage Coalition

Dance organizations
Culture of New York City
Dance in the United States
Contemporary dance
Dance in New York City
Theatres in Manhattan
Performance art in New York City
Dance venues in the United States
National Performance Network Partners
Asian Cultural Council grantees
Chelsea, Manhattan
1965 establishments in New York City